Hendrix is a town in Bryan County, Oklahoma, United States. The population was 79 at both the 2010 and the 2000 censuses. According to the Bryan County Genealogy Society, Hendrix was originally known as Kemp City.  This led to it often being confused with the neighboring town that is simply named Kemp.  Hendrix was largely destroyed by a 1916 tornado.

History
Hendrix was named for the owner of a general store named James A. Hendrix. originally called Kemp City when the Missouri, Oklahoma and Gulf Railway (MO&G) bypassed the town of Kemp in 1908 while building a line to Texas. In 1910, residents petitioned the Oklahoma Corporation Commission to force the MO&G to build a side track and stop station called Kemp City at present-day Hendrix. The commission ordered the railroad to satisfy the request, but the MO&G appealed to the Oklahoma Supreme Court, which upheld the commission in 1911.

Geography
Hendrix is located at  (33.774724, -96.406824).

Demographics

As of the census of 2000, there were 79 people, 32 households, and 24 families residing in the town. There were 38 housing units at an average density of 312.7 per square mile (122.3/km2). The racial makeup of the town was 65.82% White, 17.72% African American, 7.59% Native American, and 8.86% from two or more races.

There were 32 households, out of which 25.0% had children under the age of 18 living with them, 56.3% were married couples living together, 21.9% had a female householder with no husband present, and 21.9% were non-families. 21.9% of all households were made up of individuals, and 3.1% had someone living alone who was 65 years of age or older. The average household size was 2.47 and the average family size was 2.76.

In the town, the population was spread out, with 22.8% under the age of 18, 1.3% from 18 to 24, 30.4% from 25 to 44, 27.8% from 45 to 64, and 17.7% who were 65 years of age or older. The median age was 42 years. For every 100 females, there were 125.7 males. For every 100 females age 18 and over, there were 110.3 males.

The median income for a household in the town was $15,750, and the median income for a family was $16,563. Males had a median income of $21,250 versus $13,750 for females. The per capita income for the town was $9,378. There were 34.8% of families and 31.1% of the population living below the poverty line, including 36.4% of under eighteens and 15.4% of those over 64.

References

External links
 Encyclopedia of Oklahoma History and Culture - Hendrix

Towns in Bryan County, Oklahoma
Towns in Oklahoma